In crystallography, a Wyckoff position is a point belonging to a set of points for which site symmetry groups are conjugate subgroups of the space group. Crystallography tables give the Wyckoff positions for different space groups.

History 
The Wyckoff positions are named after Ralph Walter Graystone Wyckoff, an American X-ray crystallographer who authored several books in the field. His 1922 book, The Analytical Expression of the Results of the Theory of Space Groups, contained tables with the positional coordinates, both general and special, permitted by the symmetry elements. This book was the forerunner of International Tables for X-ray Crystallography, which first appeared in 1935.

Definition 
For any point in a unit cell, given by fractional coordinates, you can apply a symmetry operation to this point. In some cases it will move to new coordinates, while in other cases the point will remain unaffected. For example, reflecting across a mirror plane will switch all the points left and right of the mirror plane, but points exactly on the mirror plane itself will not move. We can test every symmetry operation in the crystal's point group and keep track of whether the specified point is invariant under the operation or not. The finite list of all symmetry operations which leave the given point invariant taken together make up another group, which is known as the site symmetry group of that point. By definition, all points with the same site symmetry group (or a site symmetry group in the same conjugacy class) are assigned the same Wyckoff position.

Wyckoff positions are used in calculations of crystal properties.  There are two types of positions: general and special.  
General positions are left invariant only for the identity operation (E).  Each space group has only one general position.
Special positions are left invariant by the identity operation and at least one other operation of the space group.

General positions have a site symmetry of the trivial group and all correspond to the same Wyckoff position. Special positions have a non-trivial site symmetry group.

For a particular space group, one can check the Wyckoff positions using International Tables of Crystallography. The table presents the multiplicity, Wyckoff letter and site symmetry for Wyckoff positions.

External links
 Wyckoff Positions at Bilbao Crystallographic Server
Materials Project Database
American Mineralogical Society Crystal Structure Database

References

Crystallography
Group theory